

The Techno-Sud Vigilant is a small UAV helicopter developed in France in the 1990s for reconnaissance and surveillance applications.

It is a helicopter of conventional main-tail rotor configuration, and powered by a 9 kW (12 hp) two-stroke engine. The Vigilant is marketed by Thales, and is being sold to both military and civilian users. Civilian users have accounted for the bulk of sales, using it for applications such as security or environmental monitoring.

Specifications

References
 Vigilant on FAS website
 
This article contains material that originally came from the web article "Unmanned Aerial Vehicles" by Greg Goebel, which exists in the Public Domain.

1990s French military reconnaissance aircraft
Unmanned aerial vehicles of France
1990s French helicopters
Techno-Sud aircraft
Unmanned helicopters